Alexander James Robert Kevin Penny (born 16 February 1997) is a professional footballer who plays as a defender for National League North side Kidderminster Harriers.

Early life
Penny was born in Nuneaton, Warwickshire, but moved away at a young age. He attended Withernsea High School from 2008 to 2013.

Club career
Penny played for his local club Withernsea before joining Hull City's youth system aged 11. Despite being offered an extension to his scholarship in April 2015, he signed for Southern League Premier Division club Bedworth United in September. Having made five appearances, he signed for Northern Premier League Premier Division club Stourbridge later that month. In November 2015, Penny signed for Midland League Division One club Hinckley, after making two appearances for Stourbridge. He made 17 appearances and scored two goals for Hinckley in the 2015–16 season, the team finishing fifth in the Midland League Division One.

In June 2016, Penny signed for National League North club Nuneaton Town on a one-year contract. He made 28 appearances in 2016–17 as Nuneaton finished 12th in the National League North. He joined Jamie Vardy's V9 Academy, aimed at helping non-League players into professional football, and impressed Football League scouts during training matches at the City of Manchester Stadium in May 2017.

On 19 July 2017, Penny signed for League One club Peterborough United on a three-year contract after a successful trial. The undisclosed fee set a new record for a transfer fee received by Nuneaton. On 5 August 2017, he made his Football League debut as an 89th-minute substitute in Peterborough's 2–1 home win over Plymouth Argyle, on the opening day of 2017–18. He made his first start for the club three days later, playing the first 68 minutes of a 3–1 home defeat to Barnet in the EFL Cup.

On 6 June 2018, Penny signed for Scottish Premiership club Hamilton Academical for an undisclosed fee. His contract was mutually terminated in May 2019.

Penny signed for National League North club Kidderminster Harriers in February 2020 on a two-year contract. On 5th October 2021, Penny scored his first Kidderminster Harriers goal in a 3-0 home win against Ware FC in the FA Cup 3rd Qualifying round. On 5th February 2022, he scored the only Kidderminster goal against West Ham in the FA Cup Fourth Round and went on to extend his deal to the summer of 2023 in April 2022. Penny was subsequently named in the 2021-22 National League North Team of the Season.

International career
Penny was capped by the Wales national under-16 team, playing at the 2011 and 2012 Victory Shields.

Career statistics

Honours
Kidderminster Harriers
National League North Team of the Season: 2021-22

References

External links
Alex Penny profile at the Peterborough United F.C. website

1997 births
Living people
Sportspeople from Nuneaton
Footballers from Warwickshire
English footballers
Welsh footballers
Wales youth international footballers
Association football defenders
Hull City A.F.C. players
Bedworth United F.C. players
Stourbridge F.C. players
Hinckley A.F.C. players
Nuneaton Borough F.C. players
Peterborough United F.C. players
Hamilton Academical F.C. players
Boston United F.C. players
Kidderminster Harriers F.C. players
Southern Football League players
Midland Football League players
National League (English football) players
English Football League players
Scottish Professional Football League players
English people of Welsh descent
V9 Academy players